The CVC Zebras is a professional football club in the city of Willemstad, Curaçao, founded in 2009. It plays in the Curaçao League and in the league Netherlands Antilles.

History

Squad  2013–2014

Notable players

Stefan Schmeitz

Current staff
 Michael Gomes Team Manager

Achievements
Netherlands Antilles Championship:
Curaçao League:
'''Sekshon Amatur: 1
2010–2011

Home stadiums
Ergilio Hato Stadium

International Friendlies

Sponsors
 Toshiba
 Toyota
 Multipost

External links
 Voetbal Zebras
 Zebras Champions 2010–2011 Second Division Curaçao

CVV Willemstad
CVV Willemstad
2009 establishments in Curaçao
Association football clubs established in 2009